"Wide Boy" is a song by English singer-songwriter Nik Kershaw. It was his sixth consecutive top-20 single, peaking at No. 9 on the UK Singles Chart in 1985. It was followed by "Don Quixote" which was to become the last of his string of top-20 singles on the UK chart. "Wide Boy" also charted highly in Ireland and Australia, peaking at No. 5 and No. 7, respectively.

The song was originally recorded for Kershaw's Human Racing album, but was dropped before the album was released. It later appeared on Kershaw's next album The Riddle. The single was a remix of the album version.

The accompanying video was directed by graphic designer Storm Thorgerson.

Track listings
7" single (WEA NIK 7)
A. "Wide Boy" (Remix) – 3:19
B. "So Quiet" – 3:12

12" single (WEA NIKT 7)
A. "Wide Boy" (Extended Mix) – 5:07	
B1. "Shame on You" (Remix) – 3:39	
B2. "So Quiet" – 3:07

Credits
"Wide Boy (Remix)"
Produced by Peter Collins
Remixed by Gary Langan and Nik Kershaw

"So Quiet"
Produced by Nik Kershaw
Piano Accompaniment: Nik Kershaw

"Wide Boy (Extended Mix)"
Produced by Peter Collins
Extended Mix by Nik Kershaw

"Shame on You (Remix)"
Produced by Peter Collins

Charts

Weekly charts

Year-end charts

References

 
 
 

1983 songs
1985 singles
Nik Kershaw songs
Songs written by Nik Kershaw
Song recordings produced by Peter Collins (record producer)
MCA Records singles